Panegorus son of Lycagoras, was a Macedonian hetairos. He was left behind with an undisclosed force to occupy the city of Priapus in Troad, which surrendered to Alexander the Great as he continued to Granicus in 334 BC.

References
Arrian 1.12.7
 Who's Who in the Age of Alexander the Great Edited by: Waldemar Heckel 

Generals of Alexander the Great
Ancient Macedonian generals
Hetairoi
4th-century BC Greek people